Handgun is a 1983 American vigilante film starring Karen Young, Clayton Day, and Suzie Humphreys. It was written and directed by Tony Garnett.

Plot
Shortly after moving to Dallas, a young woman is raped at gunpoint. Her anger drives her to seek revenge, and she becomes a hunter on a vengeance mission.

Production
Garnett had recently moved to the United States from the UK and wanted to make a film about gun violence there. He got a development deal from The Ladd Company, then went to Dallas to research and write the film. He succeeded in raising the $3 million budget from EMI Films. Garnett found Karen Young in London and the actors who played her parents in Boston. The rest of the cast were from Dallas. He used techniques he had developed in British drama, rehearsing and improvising with the actors for several month. "I didn't come here to make pat judgements about American culture," said Garnett. "I came to try to understand." Filming took place in the summer of 1981 in Dallas.

Garnett said EMI were "hands off" until the final edit, but that changed once they saw the film. "The problem was that I had made a slow, thoughtful, and I hope considered character study, and they were expecting a commercial hit—an action movie with some sexy rape scenes. I hadn’t delivered. Some of the distributors were disappointed as they considered the rape scenes a turn off and not sexy! I had to cut elements from the film that I now regret."

Release
Garnett sold the film to Warner Bros, which he later said he regretted. "They were producing a Clint Eastwood rape and revenge film. They didn’t want the competition so they bought mine, sat on it, and opened it in a few theatres before pulling the film. It was a failure."

References

External links
 Handgun at IMDb
 Handgun at TCMDB
 Handgun at BFI
 Handgun at Letterbox DVD

1983 films
English films
EMI Films films
British rape and revenge films
1980s English-language films
1980s British films